Animation Throwdown: The Quest for Cards is a free-to-play digital collectible card game that combines content and characters from the American animated television shows Family Guy, Futurama, American Dad!, Bob's Burgers, King of the Hill, and Archer. The game is available for Android, iOS, Steam, Kartridge and on the web via Kongregate; all platforms share the same instance and players may use more than one platform to play the same account.

Gameplay
Play is divided between maintenance activities (acquiring cards, upgrading them, and assembling card decks from the player's collection) and playing battles against the game AI; there is no direct player interaction with opponents, or direct assistance of teammates. New players begin the game with a low level starter hero, choosing one of Bob Belcher, Roger, Brian Griffin, Turanga Leela and Bobby Hill, and are provided with a collection of starter cards. Game play primarily focuses on earning resources to improve cards and obtain better cards, and to level up heroes and gain access to more powerful heroes; monetization primarily revolves around speeding up access to these improvements and providing access to premium content cards and heroes.  Like MMORPGs there is no "win" condition; players who have completed all episodic content generally continue to upgrade their decks to remain competitive with each other. Turn-based gameplay consists of playing cards drawn from a virtual deck into the player's hand onto a tableau to fight against an AI playing cards from its own deck; depending on game mode the AI's deck may be system-generated or may belong to another player. Cards attack the card directly across from them and, if unopposed, attack the opponent's "hero" tower; the battle is won when the opponent's hero is defeated.  A main tactic of card play is to play a character card and object card into the same slot to fuse into a more powerful combination ("combo") that the player has previously learned. Cards are primarily images taken from one show, though some of the lowest-level cards are generic, such as "Alcohol", "Baseball", and "Music".  Cards are played against a backdrop of a building or place from one of the shows.

Reception
The game was received very well when it was first published, picked as an Editor's Choice on Google Play, and reaching number 1 in the RPG and Adventure categories (and number 3 game overall) on the App Store, but has gotten relatively little publicity since 2016.  A 2020 review of the best CCGs on Steam noted that the category was dominated by the top two games, and mentioned Animation Throwdown's grindiness and heavy monetization as its drawbacks.

References

IOS games
Android (operating system) games
Browser-based multiplayer online games
2016 video games
Digital collectible card games
Crossover video games
Crossover fighting games
Fox animation
Family Guy
Futurama video games
American Dad!
Bob's Burgers
King of the Hill
Archer (2009 TV series)
Video games based on animated television series
Video games developed in the United States
Multiplayer and single-player video games